The 2019 Thai League 1 is the 23rd season of the Thai League 1, the top Thai professional league for association football clubs, since its establishment in 1996, also known as Toyota Thai League due to the sponsorship deal with Toyota Motor Thailand. A total of 16 teams will compete in the league. The season began on 22 February 2019 and is scheduled to conclude on 27 October 2019.

Buriram United are the defending champions, while PTT Rayong, Trat and Chiangmai have entered as the promoted teams from the 2018 Thai League 2.

The 1st transfer window is from 26 November 2018 to 19 February 2019 while the 2nd transfer window is from 24 June 2019 to 19 July 2019.

Chiangrai United won the league for the first time in history, this is the first time since 2007 that neither Muangthong United nor Buriram United were not crowned champions.

Changes from last season

Team changes

Promoted clubs
Promoted from the 2018 Thai League 2
 PTT Rayong
 Trat
 Chiangmai

Relegated clubs

Relegated from the 2018 Thai League 1
 Bangkok Glass
 Police Tero
 Navy
 Ubon United
 Air Force Central

Renamed clubs
 Pattaya United was renamed to Samut Prakan City, and relocated to Samut Prakan

Teams

Stadium and locations

Note: Table lists in alphabetical order.

Stadium changes
Due to Samut Prakan City relocation from Pattaya, they will use the Samut Prakarn Stadium, which will also be used by Samut Prakan whom play in Thai League 4.
Chiangmai used the Singha Stadium in Chiangrai from August until September, returning to their home ground for the final game of the season.
Chonburi used the Sattahip Navy Stadium in Chonburi for the visit of Chainat for the final game of the season.

Personnel and sponsoring
Note: Flags indicate national team as has been defined under FIFA eligibility rules. Players may hold more than one non-FIFA nationality.

Managerial changes

Foreign Players

League table

Positions by round

Results by match played

Results

Season statistics

Top scorers
As of 26 October 2019.

Top assists
As of 26 October 2019.

Hat-tricks

Clean sheets
As of 26 October 2019.

Awards

Monthly awards

Attendances

Overall statistical table

Attendances by home match played

Source: Thai League

See also
 2019 Thai League 2
 2019 Thai League 3
 2019 Thai League 4
 2019 Thailand Amateur League
 2019 Thai FA Cup
 2019 Thai League Cup
 2019 Thailand Champions Cup
 List of foreign Thai League 1 players

References

2019
2019 in Asian association football leagues
2019 in Thai football leagues